Nyenye Rovers Football Club was a Lesotho football club based in Leribe.

History 
It was based in the city of Leribe in the Leribe District and played long time in the Lesotho Premier League. The club became in 2015, the football team of the Limkokwing University of Creative Technology and was reformed to Limkokwing University FC.

Stadium
The team plays at the 1,000 capacity St. Monica's Primary and Morate High School Stadium.

References

External links
Soccerway

Football clubs in Lesotho
Association football clubs disestablished in 2015